Ninja Dragon (Cantonese: 上海風雲 Jyutping: soeng6 hoi2 fung1 wan4) is a 1986 Hong Kong English-language martial arts action crime film directed by Godfrey Ho. Produced by Joseph Lai and Betty Chan, the film stars Richard Harrison and Bruce Stallion in lead roles.

Plot 
Set in Great Shanghai – two rival gangs, the Furious Fox and the Black Eagle are fighting to establish domination in the territory. Only one force can stop the never-ending killings… The Ninja Dragon!

Cast 
 Richard Harrison as Ninja Master Gordon
 Bruce Stallion as Paul
 Melvin Pitcher
 Freya Patrick
 Konrad Chang
 Lily Lan
 Martin Lee
 Pierre Tremblay
 Chung Tien Shih
 Jean Tang
 Tien Mao
 Hsieh Wang
 Dick Lo
 Mason Shin
 Billy Pang

External links 
 IMDB

1986 films
1986 martial arts films
Hong Kong martial arts films
1980s English-language films
1980s Hong Kong films